Berón de Astrada Department is a  department of Corrientes Province in Argentina.

Settlements
Berón de Astrada
Yahapé

Departments of Corrientes Province